Quinpirole is a psychoactive drug and research chemical which acts as a selective D2 and D3 receptor agonist. It is used in scientific research. Quinpirole has been shown to increase locomotion and sniffing behavior in mice treated with it. At least one study has found that quinpirole induces compulsive behavior symptomatic of obsessive compulsive disorder in rats.  Another study in rats show that quinpirole produces significant THC-like effects when metabolic degradation of anandamide is inhibited, supporting the hypothesis that these effects of quinpirole are mediated by cannabinoid CB1 receptors. Quinpirole may also reduce relapse in adolescent rat models of cocaine addiction.

Experiments in flies found quinpirole may have neuroprotective effects against Parkinson's disease-like pathology.  Moreover, in primary neuronal cultures it also reduces the rate of firing in dopaminergic neurons.

See also
 Quinelorane

References 

Pyrazoloquinolines
Dopamine agonists